Laalkuthi is an original Indian Bengali language thriller drama television series which is broadcasting on the Bengali general entertainment channel Zee Bangla and is also available on the digital platform ZEE5. It premiered on 2 May 2022 and stars Rooqma Ray and Rahul Banerjee.

Plot
Vikram with his family stays in Laalkuthi and a mystery is related to that house which is unknown to everyone. But eveyone can feel that something is wrong in their house. The story revolves around how Anamika after getting married to Vikram reveal the secret or mystery of Laalkuthi as she also felt that something is wrong with this house.

Cast

Main
 Rukma Roy as Ujjayini Dastidar (née Dutta) aka Jini: Vikram's wife.
 Anamika Roy Chowdhury aka Anu - (In Disguise). 
 Rahul Banerjee as Vikram Dastidar: Bibhuti and Supriya's son,Sourjyo's younger brother; Anamika's husband
 Debmalya Gupta as young Vikram

Recurring
 Anamika Saha as Karunamoyee Dastidar: Vikram's grandmother; Anamika's grandmother-in-law; Bibhuti's mother; Senior-most member of Lalkuthi House.
 Hritojeet Chatterjee as Souryo Dastidar: Bibhuti and Supriya's elder son; Vikram's elder brother
 Sneha Chatterjee as Baishali Dastidar (née Dutta) aka Shelly: Debrup and Alakananda's elder daughter; Jini's elder sister; Souryo's wife
 Beas Dhar as young Baishali
 Debdut Ghosh as Bibhuti Dastidar: Vikram and Sourya's father, Supriya's husband
 Tanuka Chatterjee as Supriya Dastidar: Vikram and Sourya's mother; Bibhuti's wife
 Shraboni Bonik as Sulekha: Dastidar's employee. 
 Pinky Mallick as Bishakha Deb: Supriya's sister-in-law; Phalguni's wife; Bishwajit and Bithi's mother; Mohua's mother in law.
 Judhajit Banerjee as Phalguni Deb: Vikram and Sourya's maternal uncle; Supriya's elder brother; Bishakha's husband; Bishwajit and Bithi's father.
 Sritama Bhattacharjee as Bithi Deb: Vikram's maternal cousin sister; Bishwa's elder sister; Bishakha and Phalguni's daughter; Tirtha's wife.
 Sutirtha Saha as Tirtha: Bithi's husband.
 Suvajit Kar as Biswa Deb: Phalguni and Bishakha's son; Vikram and Sourya's maternal cousin brother; Supriya's nephew; Mohua's husband; .
 Prriyam Chakraborty as Mohua Deb (née Dutta): Bishwa's wife; Phalguni and Bishakha's daughter in law.
 Deerghoi Paul as Richa: an office employee.
 Payel Dutta as Rupali Das: Baishali's care taker.
 Sohon Bandopadhyay as Abhiroop Roy Chowdhury (real Dutta): Anamika's uncle.
 Anindita Saha Kapileswari as Rajeshwari Roy Chowdhury (real Dutta): Anamika's aunt
 Bharat Kaul as Debrup Dutta: Son of G.C.Dutta; Alakananda's husband; Baishali and Ujjayini's father; Owner of Lalkuthi and G.C.Dutta & Sons
 Bhola Tamang as Manager of Dutta Jewellers.
 Abanti Dutta as Dr. Sen
 Anamika Chakraborty as Jhilly / Fake Jini - Ujjayini's friend.

References

Zee Bangla original programming
Bengali-language television programming in India
2022 Indian television series debuts
Indian drama television series